Compsodrillia gracilis is a species of sea snail, a marine gastropod mollusk in the family Pseudomelatomidae, the turrids and allies.

Distribution
This marine species occurs off the Galapagos Islands.

References

 McLean, J.H. & Poorman, R. (1971) New species of tropical Eastern Pacific Turridae. The Veliger, 14, 89–113

External links
 
 

gracilis
Gastropods described in 1971